Madih Talal (born 17 August 1997) is a French professional footballer who plays as a midfielder for Greek Super League 2 club Kifisia.

Career
Talal joined the academy of Angers SCO in 2014, after playing in various youth sides in Paris.

In June 2017, Talal joined Amiens SC from Angers, signing a three-year deal. He immediately joined Amiens reserve side, becoming an essential member of the side scoring 4 goals in 10 games. Talal made his professional debut with Amiens in a 6–0 Coupe de France loss to Sochaux on 7 January 2018.

In August 2018, Talal joined L'Entente SSG on loan for the 2018–19 season.

Released at the end of his Amiens SC contract, Talal signed for Spanish Segunda División B side Las Rozas CF in August 2020. After half a year in Spain he returned to France with Red Star in January 2021.

In July 2022, Talal joined Kifisia in Greece.

Personal life
Born in France, Talal is of Moroccan descent.

References

External links
 
 
 

1997 births
Living people
Footballers from Paris
Association football midfielders
French footballers
French sportspeople of Moroccan descent
Ligue 1 players
Championnat National players
Championnat National 3 players
Segunda División B players
Amiens SC players
Entente SSG players
Las Rozas CF players
Red Star F.C. players
US Avranches players
A.E. Kifisia F.C. players
French expatriate footballers
Expatriate footballers in Spain
French expatriate sportspeople in Spain
Expatriate footballers in Greece
French expatriate sportspeople in Greece